Events in the year 1927 in Germany.

Incumbents

National level
President
Paul von Hindenburg (Non-partisan)

Chancellor
Wilhelm Marx (Centre) (2nd term)

Events
 10 January - The film Metropolis is released.
 19–21 August - The 3rd Nazi Party Congress is held in Nuremberg and the propaganda film Eine Symphonie des Kampfwillens is made at this rally.
 16 September - President Paul von Hindenburg repudiates German responsibility for the Great War
 23 November - Germany and Poland sign a trade pact
 Date unknown:
 Uncertainty principle introduced by German physicist Werner Heisenberg
 Emil Lerp invented the transportable gasoline chainsaw.

Births
4 January - Claus Jacobi, German journalist (died 2013)
5 January - Dieter Henrich, German philosopher (died 2022)
12 January - Ignaz Bubis, President of Central Council of Jews in Germany (died 1999)
18 January - Werner Liebrich, German international footballer (died 1995)
26 January - Hubert Schieth, German football manager (died 2013)
28 January - Karl Bögelein, German international footballer and coach (died 2016)
31 January - Werner Leich, German bishop of the Evangelical Church in Thuringia (died 2022)
3 February - Friedrich Karl Flick, German industrialist and billionaire (died 2006)
4 February - Horst Ehmke, German politician (died 2017)
11 February - Dieter Eppler, German television actor (died 2008)
13 February - Herbert Pilch, German linguist and celtologist (died 2018)
16 February - Ludwig Averkamp, German prelate of Roman Catholic Church (died 2013)
21 February - Reinhard Appel, German journalist (died 2011)
8 March - Werner Potzernheim, German cyclist (died 2014)
11 March - Joachim Fuchsberger, German television presenter and actor (died 2014)
13 March - Gabriel Bach, Israeli State Attorney, Eichmann trial prosecutor, jurist, Israeli Supreme Court Justice (1982–1997)  (died 2022).
15 March - Hanns-Joachim Friedrichs, German journalist (died 1995)
21 March - Hans-Dietrich Genscher, German politician (died 2016)
24 March - Martin Walser, German writer
25 March - Heinz Kunert, German engineer (died 2012)
26 March - Bernhard Philberth, German physicist, engineer, philosopher and theologian (died 2010)
16 April - Pope Benedict XVI
17 April - Margot Honecker, German politician (died 2016)
18 April - Erwin Eisch, German glass artist (died 2022)
1 May - Horst Drinda, German actor (died 2005)
4 May - Peter Boenisch, German journalist (died 2005)
4 May - Trude Herr, singer (died 1991)
5 May - Robert Spaemann, German philosopher (died 2018)
9 May 
 Manfred Eigen, German biophysical chemist 
 Wim Thoelke, German television presenter (died 1995)
10 May - Albert Friedlander, German rabbi and teacher (died 2004)
18 May - Egon Monk, German film director and writer (died 2007)
22 May - Hubert Luthe, German bishop of Roman-Catholic Church (died 2014)
23 May - Dieter Hildebrandt, German comedian and cabaret artist (died 2013)
27 May - Peter Malkin, German-born Israeli Mossad agent who captured Adolf Eichmann (died 2005)
29 May - Charlotte Kerr, German actress, writer and journalist (died 2011)
30 May - Werner Haas, German motorcycle racer (died 1956)
10 June - Hugo Budinger, German field hockey player (died 2017)
29 June - Karl Ravens, German politician (died 2017)
16 July 
 Lothar Blumhagen, German actor (died 2023)
 Alois Eisenträger, German footballer (died 2017)
18 July - Kurt Masur, German conductor (died 2015)
5 August - Rolf Wütherich, German automotive engineer, racing driver and aviator (died 1981)
21 August - Wilhelm Killmayer, German composer of classical music, a conductor and an academic teacher (died 2017)
23 August - Walter Giller, German actor (died 2011)
27 August - Liselott Linsenhoff, German equestrian (died 1999)
2 September - Tzvi Avni, German-born Israeli composer
20 September - Peter Borgelt, German actor (died 1994)
2 October - Uta Ranke-Heinemann, German theologian (died 2021)
4 October - Wolf Kahn, German-American painter (died 2020)
5 October - Rolf Herricht, German actor and comedian (died 1981)
16 October - Günter Grass, Danzig-born writer, recipient of the Nobel Prize in Literature (died 2015)
17 October - Friedrich Hirzebruch, German mathematician (died 2012)
19 October - Hans Schäfer, German footballer (died 2017)
27 October - Thomas Nipperdey, German historian (died 1992)
1 November - Marcel Ophuls, German documentary film maker
5 November - Armin Weiss, German chemist and politician (died 2010)
9 November - Shlomo "Chich" Lahat, German-born Israeli general and politician serving as the 8th mayor of Tel Aviv
21 November - Barbara Rütting, German actress
8 December - Niklas Luhmann, German sociologist (died 1998)
31 December - Dieter Noll, German writer (died 2008)

Deaths
 January 10 - Heinrich von Gossler, German general (born 1841)
 January 30 - Friedrich Koch, German teacher, composer, cellist (born 1862)
 February 16 - Carl von Opel, German automotive pioneer (born 1869)
 April 30 - Friedrich von Scholtz, German general (born 1854)
 May 5 - Franziska Tiburtius, German doctor (born 1843)
 May 26 - Hermann von Stein, German general (born 1854)
 July 5 - Albrecht Kossel, German biochemist and pioneer in the study of genetics. (born 1853)
 July 8 - Max Hoffmann, German general (born 1869)
 October 18 - Ludwig Darmstaedter, German chemist (born 1845)
 October 20 - Eugen von Knilling, German politician (born 1856)
 October 30 - Maximilian Harden, German journalist (born 1861)

References

 
Years of the 20th century in Germany
Germany
Germany